USS R-4 (SS-81) was an R-class coastal and harbor defense submarine of the United States Navy.

Construction and commissioning
R-4′s keel was laid down on 16 October 1917 by the Fore River Shipbuilding Company in Quincy, Massachusetts. She was launched on 26 October 1918, sponsored by Mrs. Albert W. Stahl, and commissioned on 28 March 1919.

Service history
After outfitting at Boston Navy Yard, R-4 joined Submarine Division 9 of the Atlantic Fleet at New London, Connecticut on 12 August 1919. She sailed 4 December 1919 for Norfolk, Virginia, and winter operations in the Gulf of Mexico from 21 January to 14 April 1920. R-4 later returned to New England on 18 May for four months of maneuvers with her division.  Given hull classification symbol SS-81 in July, she arrived at Norfolk on 15 September for an overhaul lasting until April 1921.

R-4 deployed to the Pacific Ocean on 11 April 1921, transited the Panama Canal on 28 May, and arrived at her new base, San Pedro, California, on 30 June. On 12 September 1925 R-4 rescued John Rodgers and his crew, who had just failed to make the first aerial crossing of the Pacific from California to Hawaii, off the coast of Kauai.

R-4, ordered back to the Atlantic with Divisions 9 and 14 on 12 December 1930, transited the Panama Canal on 18 January 1931, and arrived on 9 February at New London. She was soon assigned to Division 4 and served as training ship for the next ten years on rotating duty between the New London Submarine School and the Yale University NROTC unit. An interesting incident took place during this assignment: according to one enlisted man (trainee), the submarine became stuck in the winter ice on the river and the trainees had to walk back to base.  In 1940 and 1941, Lieutenant Glynn R. Donaho, a future vice admiral, was her commanding officer.

R-4 departed New London on 26 May 1941 for Key West, Florida, and patrol duty in the Florida Straits with Division 12. Back at New London for the first two weeks in July, she returned to Key West at midmonth and until March 1945 alternated duties for the Fleet Sonar School with patrols in the Florida Strait and the Yucatán Channel.

At Port Everglades, Florida, from 11 March to 15 April 1945, R-4 returned to Key West to prepare for inactivation. On 1 June she was withdrawn from active duty and on 4 June she got underway for Philadelphia. Escorted by SC-1001 she arrived at Philadelphia on 8 June, decommissioned on 18 June and was struck from the Naval Vessel Register on 11 July. The following January, 1946, she was sold for scrap to the North American Smelting Company.

References

External links
 
 1925-9-12 Modest Heroes of the Submarine R-4 at Hawaii Aviation

United States R-class submarines
World War II submarines of the United States
Ships built in Quincy, Massachusetts
1918 ships